Barrett Browning may refer to:

 Misspelling for Barret Browning (1984–), American baseball player
 Misconstructions as a surname within the family of English poet Robert Browning:
 Elizabeth Barrett Browning (1806–1861), poet wife of the poet
 Robert Barrett Browning (1849–1912), painter son of the two poets

See also 
 Robert Browning (1812–1889), poet whose wife and son each used "Barrett" as a middle name